That's My Line is a 1931 American Pre-Code comedy film directed by Fatty Arbuckle and starring Louis John Bartels, Paul Hurst, Gino Corrado, Al Thompson and Glen Cavender.

Cast
 Louis John Bartels - The Traveling Man
 Paul Hurst
 Doris McMahon
 Gino Corrado
 Bert Young
 Al Thompson
 Glen Cavender

See also
 Fatty Arbuckle filmography

External links

1931 films
1931 comedy films
1931 short films
Films directed by Roscoe Arbuckle
RKO Pictures short films
American black-and-white films
Films with screenplays by Roscoe Arbuckle
American comedy short films
1930s English-language films
1930s American films
English-language comedy films